When Love is New is an album by soul singer Billy Paul. It was produced by Kenny Gamble & Leon Huff; arranged by Bobby Martin, Dexter Wansel, Norman Harris, and Jack Faith; and engineered by Joe Tarsia. Released in December 1975, it reached #139 on the Billboard Pop Album chart and #17 on the Soul chart. It includes the singles "Let's Make a Baby" which hit #83 on the Pop singles chart, #18 on the Soul chart, and #30 in the UK and "People Power" which reached #82 on the Soul chart and #14 on the U.S. Dance chart. The album was reissued on CD in 2010  by the U.K.'s Edsel Records. This was the final album where Paul was backed by MFSB, the house band of Philadelphia International Records (PIR).

Release and critical reaction

The album was released in November 1975. Its first single, "Let's Make a Baby" performed well, breaking into the Hot 100 Pop charts and Soul top-twenty. It was also a top-40 hit in the U.K. "People Power" was Paul's second single from the album and his first and only Dance hit.

In his 3 January 1976 column for Billboard, Tom Moulton noted: "Without a doubt, the music of Philadelphia is the strongest influence on the disco market these days. A quick glimpse : The O'Jays with their recent No. 1 disco audience response record in "I Love Music" (PIR); the Mighty Clouds of Joy's current No. 1 disco record "MIGHTY HIGH" (ABC); Harold Melvin & the Blue Notes, the Salsoul Orchestra and Archie Bell & the Drells all with songs on the disco listing; and Billy Paul and Dee Dee Sharp both with records fast gaining acceptance at the club level. Indications are, too, that the city's musical influence is going to continue well through 1976.

Stephen McMillian called the album "fantastic" and recounted Paul's Soul Train appearance on 4 April 1976 to promote it: 

Allmusic's Andrew Hamilton reviewed the title track: "One of Kenny Gamble and Leon Huff's classiest numbers, it speaks of the joys of love in its embryonic stage -- when it's new. A standard in waiting, it reminds of '50s and '60s MOR songs done by Tony Bennett, Vic Damone, Nat King Cole, and others. Bennett detested most pop/rock songs, dismissing them as junk, but would have enjoyed wrapping his golden vocal chords around this warmer. Billy Paul gives a good account on the 1975 release with a deliberate articulation of the thoughtful, heartfelt lyrics.

Hamilton said of "Malorie": "sounds like a song suited for the big-band singers of the '40s and '50s. The light airy swinger features Paul displaying his jazz pipes -- scatting, jiving, exhorting -- as he raves about some damsel, accompanied by timely female vocals."

On the 2010 Edsel CD reissue, Joe Marchese of The Second Disc said: "While not featuring any hits the magnitude of his majestic 'Me and Mrs. Jones,' the goods are still delivered by writer/producers Gamble and Huff and arrangers including Dexter Wansel."

Track listing
All tracks composed by Kenny Gamble & Leon Huff; except where indicated

Side 1
"People Power" - (Gene McFadden, John Whitehead, Victor Carstarphen)  -  4:18
"America (We Need the Light)" - (Billy Paul, Donald Level, Kenny Gamble)  -  5:20
"Let the Dollar Circulate" - (Billy Paul, Donald Level)  -  4:58
"Malorie" - (Edward Osborne)  -  3:46

Side 2
"When Love is New"  -  5:28
"I Want 'Cha Baby"  -  6:18
"Let's Make a Baby"  -  7:11

Personnel
Billy Paul - lead and backing vocals, producer on "Let the Dollar Circulate"
Dexter Wansel - keyboards, synthesizers, arranger on "People Power"
Norman Harris - guitar, arranger on "I Want 'Cha Baby"
Bobby Eli, Bunny Sigler, David Bay, Roland Chambers - guitar
Eddie Green, Leon Huff - piano
Vincent Montana, Jr. - vibraphone
Anthony Jackson, Ron Baker - bass
Earl Young, Norman Farrington - drums
Don Renaldo - horns, strings
Larry Washington - congas
Lenny Pakula - organ
Carla Benson, Evette Benton, Barbara Ingram - backing vocals
Bobby Martin - arranger on "America (We Need the Light)", "Let the Dollar Circulate", "When Love is New" and "Let's Make a Baby"
Jack Faith - arranger on "Malorie"
Technical
Joe Tarsia - engineer
Jim Gallagher, Mike Hutchinson - assistant engineers
Carl Barile, Ed Lee - design
Don Hunstein - photography

Charts
Albums

Singles

See also
List of number-one R&B albums of 1976 (U.S.)

References

External links
When Love is New at Discogs
When Love is New at DereksMusicBlog

1975 albums
Billy Paul albums
Albums produced by Kenneth Gamble
Albums produced by Leon Huff
Albums arranged by Bobby Martin
Albums recorded at Sigma Sound Studios
Philadelphia International Records albums